The 1987 Cal State Hayward Pioneers football team represented California State University, Hayward—now known as California State University, East Bay—as a member of the Northern California Athletic Conference (NCAC) during the 1987 NCAA Division II football season. Led by 13th-year head coach Tim Tierney, Cal State Hayward compiled an overall record of 2–8 with a mark of 2–3 in conference play, tying for fourth place in the NCAC. The team was outscored by its opponents 237 to 146 for the season. The Pioneers played home games at Pioneer Stadium in Hayward, California.

Schedule

References

Cal State Hayward
Cal State Hayward Pioneers football seasons
Cal State Hayward Pioneers football